Gudia is a 1997 Indian drama film directed by Gautam Ghose. It was screened in the Un Certain Regard section at the 1997 Cannes Film Festival.

Plot
It is the story of a ventriloquist (Mithun Chakraborty), his life and love. It is based on a play by Mahasweta Devi.

Cast
 Mithun Chakraborty as John Mendes
 Nandana Sen as Rosemary Braganza / Urvashi (voice) (as Nandana Dev Sen)
 Pran as Hameed
 Mohan Agashe as Braganza
 Masood Akhtar as Munna Bhai
 Tiku Talsania
 Avtar Gill as Politician
 Anjan Srivastav as Rosemary's boss

References

External links

1997 films
1997 drama films
1990s Hindi-language films
Indian drama films
Films directed by Goutam Ghose
Best Hindi Feature Film National Film Award winners
Hindi-language drama films